Philine Fischer, née Franke, married name Sannemüller (1 February 1919 – 22 January 2001) was a German opera and concert singer (soprano).

Life and career 
Born in Leipzig, Fischer made her debut in 1944 as "Micaela" in Bizet's Carmen at the Oldenburgisches Staatstheater. After the success of the Handel oratorio Messiah conducted by Hermann Abendroth in the St. Thomas Church, Leipzig in 1945, she advanced to the status of prima donna of the 50s. From 1945 to 1952 she was engaged at the Leipzig Opera and from 1952 to 1980 at the Halle Opera House, which awarded her honorary membership. She performed regularly at the Handel Festival, Halle and  she sang 14 operas by Handel, among others Alcina, Deidamia and Mahamaya (as the character of Cleofide in the original libretto is named in a German translation) in Poro. She worked with the likes of Horst-Tanu Margraf, Rudolf Heinrich, Heinz Rückert, Rolf Apreck, Werner Enders, Kurt Hübenthal, Günther Leib and Hellmuth Kaphahn. In Hamburg she was appointed Kammersänger. Her last role in Halle was Herodias in Salome by Richard Strauss. She retired in 1981 and died in Leipzig at age 81.

Discography 
 Mahamaya in Händel's Poro, Händel-Festspielorchester Halle, conductor: Horst-Tanu Margraf, recorded 7/1958, Berlin Classics 1998 (0093742BC)

Further reading 
 Minister of Intra-German Relations (editor): SBZ-Biographie. Deutscher Bundes-Verlag, Berlin 1964, .
 Präsidium der Volkskammer der Deutschen Demokratischen Republik (editor): Die Volkskammer der Deutschen Demokratischen Republik, 4. Wahlperiode. Staatsverlag der DDR, Berlin 1964, .
 Peter Krumbiegel, Clemens Prokop: Jauchzet, frohlocket: Du musst kein Schwein sein. Von Bach, den Prinzen und einer Leipziger Musikerfamilie. Bärenreiter publishing house, Kassel 2004, .
 Fischer, Philine. In Karl-Josef Kutsch, Leo Riemens: Großes Sängerlexikon. Directmedia Digitale Bibliothek 33, Berlin 2000, .

References

External links 
 
 
 

1919 births
2001 deaths
Musicians from Leipzig
German operatic sopranos
Recipients of the Patriotic Order of Merit
Recipients of the Banner of Labor
Handel Prize winners
20th-century German  women opera singers
University of Music and Theatre Leipzig alumni